Western Heights is a suburb on the western boundary of the city of Hamilton in the Waikato region of the North Island of New Zealand.

Skyline landmarks include Dinsdale water reservoir, the adjacent Newcastle reservoir, one of the largest in the city holding , and a block of gum trees. As these mature many have had to be culled.
Google Earth maps highlight the area as the most clearly defined block to Hamilton's west.
Situated as it is to the west of the ridge on the city's boundary, the suburb is a little exposed to wind but the views are good.

Hamilton Boundary Road was renamed Brymer Road by Waipa County Council in 1967, after Mr Brymer, a local property owner. In 2007 $865,000 was spent widening it to become the main road through Western Heights. In 2018 it was used by 3,600 vehicles a day, 60 of them buses on the half hourly route 3. See also - List of streets in Hamilton.

Demographics
In the 2018 census the new area of Western Heights (Hamilton City) was created from parts of Brymer, Norton and Dinsdale North. It includes the area marked as Grandview Heights on the 1:50,000 map.

Western Heights had a population of 2,913 at the 2018 New Zealand census, an increase of 372 people (14.6%) since the 2013 census, and an increase of 672 people (30.0%) since the 2006 census. There were 960 households, comprising 1,407 males and 1,506 females, giving a sex ratio of 0.93 males per female. The median age was 40.4 years (compared with 37.4 years nationally), with 546 people (18.7%) aged under 15 years, 522 (17.9%) aged 15 to 29, 1,419 (48.7%) aged 30 to 64, and 426 (14.6%) aged 65 or older.

Ethnicities were 72.3% European/Pākehā, 15.2% Māori, 4.2% Pacific peoples, 19.8% Asian, and 3.0% other ethnicities. People may identify with more than one ethnicity.

The percentage of people born overseas was 24.8, compared with 27.1% nationally.

Although some people chose not to answer the census's question about religious affiliation, 42.8% had no religion, 38.1% were Christian, 0.5% had Māori religious beliefs, 4.8% were Hindu, 1.9% were Muslim, 1.5% were Buddhist and 3.6% had other religions.

Of those at least 15 years old, 552 (23.3%) people had a bachelor's or higher degree, and 390 (16.5%) people had no formal qualifications. The median income was $39,500, compared with $31,800 nationally. 528 people (22.3%) earned over $70,000 compared to 17.2% nationally. The employment status of those at least 15 was that 1,302 (55.0%) people were employed full-time, 336 (14.2%) were part-time, and 81 (3.4%) were unemployed.

References 

Suburbs of Hamilton, New Zealand